Pterolobium membranulaceum is a flowering plant in the legume family, Fabaceae. The woody vine is endemic to secondary forest of the Philippines. Its general appearance is comparable to others of its genus, with bipinnate leaves and rufous samara fruit. The pubescent petiole and leaf rachis vary between 10 and 21 cm in length. The leaves carry 5 to 10 pairs of pinnae, with 6 to 8 pairs of oblong leaflets per pinna. The pubescent and loosely flowered inflorescences are borne on the side or tips of branches.

References

External links
 P. membranulaceum, The Plant List
 Photo of foliage and fruit
 Published in: Publications of the Bureau of Science Government Laboratories 35: 22. 1905. (Dec 1905) (Publ. Bur. Sci. Gov. Lab.)

membranulaceum
Endemic flora of the Philippines
Taxa named by Francisco Manuel Blanco